Ryan Harrison and Michael Venus won the men's doubles tennis title at the 2017 French Open, defeating Santiago González and Donald Young in the final, 7–6(7–5), 6–7(4–7), 6–3. In a rare coincidence, none of the four players had ever previously appeared in the men's doubles finals of a Grand Slam tournament prior to the event.

Feliciano López and Marc López were the defending champions, but lost to Julio Peralta and Horacio Zeballos in the first round.

Henri Kontinen retained the ATP no. 1 doubles ranking at the end of tournament despite he lost in the first round after fellow contenders Nicolas Mahut and Marcelo Melo lost in the first and second rounds, respectively.

Seeds

Draw

Finals

Top half

Section 1

Section 2

Bottom half

Section 3

Section 4

References

External links
2017 French Open – Men's draws and results at the International Tennis Federation

Men's Doubles
French Open by year – Men's doubles
French Open - Men's Doubles